This is a list of Ministers of Foreign Affairs of the Northern Cyprus since the proclamation of the Turkish Federated State of Cyprus in 1976:

External links 
 Official list on the Web site of the Ministry

Foreign ministers of Northern Cyprus
Ministers of Foreign Affairs